Franck Cazalon (born 2 September 1957 in Paris, France) is a French basketball player who played 17 times for the men's French national basketball team between 1980 and 1985.

References

1957 births
Living people
Basketball players from Paris
ES Avignon Basket players
French men's basketball players
Stade Français basketball players